Župa  is a village in the municipality of Trebinje, Republika Srpska, Bosnia and Herzegovina.

History
In 1390, a Kobilić is mentioned as the knez (duke) of "Župa".

References

Villages in Republika Srpska
Populated places in Trebinje